Mediafax is a Romanian media company headquartered in Bucharest and founded in 1991. It is a part of the MediaPro Group and its primary line of business is a news and photography service. The company's Mediafax Business Information products include a variety of business news and data, such as currency market, business opportunities, calls for tender, statistics and company data.

See also
BBN
BBC
CNN
ITN

External links
 Mediafax official site

Companies based in Bucharest
Mass media companies established in 1991
Photography in Romania
News agencies based in Romania
1991 establishments in Romania